Kentucky Days is a 1923 American silent film directed by David Selman (credited as David Soloman), which stars Dustin Farnum, Margaret Fielding, and Miss Woodthrop. The screenplay was written by Dorothy Yost from a story by John Lynch. It was released on December 2, 1923.

Plot
As described in a film magazine review, in 1849, John Buckner, Kentuckian, goes West to the California goldfields and makes a fortune. Returning to Kentucky after a couple of years, he is convinced that his wife loves Gordon Carter and kills the latter in a duel. John heads  West again taking his wife Elizabeth with him, although they are still on bad terms. Elizabeth's unfailing courage during the many perils of the journey wins John's esteem. After he rescues her when she is lost in a sandstorm, they are completely reconciled.

Cast
 Dustin Farnum as Don Buckner
 Margaret Fielding as Elizabeth Clayborne
 Miss Woodthrop as Margarite Buckner
 Bruce Gordon as Gordon Carter
 William De Vaull as Scipio

References

External links
 
 
 

Fox Film films
Films directed by David Selman
American silent feature films
1920s romance films
American romance films
American black-and-white films
1920s English-language films
Silent romance films
1920s American films